is a fictional character and the main protagonist of the manga series Jujutsu Kaisen created by Gege Akutami. Yuji is a first-year jujutsu sorcerer at Tokyo Jujutsu High who is thrown into the world of sorcery after he ate a cursed object: a finger belonging to Ryomen Sukuna (宿儺, Sukuna), a powerful cursed spirit—a being manifested from cursed energy from the negative emotions flowing from humans. With his classmates, Yuji exorcises curses while trying to honor his grandfather's legacy and save others unconditionally so that when he is executed after eating all twenty fingers, he will not be alone in his death.

Throughout the series, Yuji and exceptional cursed techniques are developed as he faces down different curses and the emotional blowback of his actions. Despite having only practiced using cursed energy for a few months, Yuji is tremendously powerful even without having become Sukuna's Vessel. Yuji believes strongly in the value of life and works to make sure everyone he meets, no matter how deep his connection to them may be, receives proper treatment.

In the anime adaptation of the manga, Yuji is voiced by Junya Enoki in Japanese and Adam McArthur in English. The character has been received positively by critics, with many praising his character development though some critics were divided if he is a proper unique shōnen protagonist.

Concept 
Yuji was created by Gege Akutami. His first name, Yuji, translates to "abundant, help, and brave" with the individual syllables translating as such:  "yu" to slow or relaxing, while "ji" to "caring for others." His family name, Itadori, comes from Japanese knotweed, or Fallopia japonica which is used in traditional medicine to take away pain which represents Yuji's caring interior. Akutami has stated if he were to identify Yuji's theme music it would be "Heart ni Hi wo Tsukete" by 9mm Parabellum Bullet and "Itsuka Dokoka De" by Kuchiroro, songs that combine heavy metal with chill jazz. 

The idea of Yuji consuming Ryomen Sukuna and having to deal with the demon in the process was inspired by the main character from Masashi Kishimoto manga Naruto, Naruto Uzumaki, who deals with a Nine-Tailed Demon Fox known as Kurama ever since his birth. Yuji was written with the idea of losing several fights across the manga in order to learn from each defeat and become stronger in the aftermath. A major inspiration for Yuji's decision was the television series Breaking Bad. Following Yoshino's death, Akutami wanted to make the main character to become berserker but was unable to do it due to how he would defeat Mahito. Following this arc, Akutami wanted to give Yuji his own special technique but did not find it unique. In the next arc, Akutami took a liking to Yuji's and Choso's relationship and commented the ending of the arc was an homage to Tite Kubo's Bleach. His teamup with Kugisaki was Akutami's favorite battle in the series. Akutami wished for Yuji to be a more popular character, leading to a change of pace after several consecutive battles and be more involved in a chapter about love interests.

Yuji's appearance wearing a hoodie was, in Akutami's eyes, meant to symbolize his hesitancy and indecisiveness. According to Akutami, the end of Yuji's character arc has already been planned in advance with it set to finish within the next two years, though Sukuna's finale is up in air. He also debunked popular fan theories that Yuji's mother was Yuki Tsukumo.

Yuji has been described as "being naïve, thoughtful, and adorable, all while being possessed by an ancient evil." The viscerally of his character mixed with his lighthearted traits are contrasted throughout his arc. As Akutami never intended for his series to be serialized, Jujutsu Kaisen 0 main protagonist Yuta Okkotsu was originally intended to be the main protagonist of the franchise. Similarities between the two characters include their introduction into the world of jujutsu, tragedy, naivety and having become faced with death. Despite their similarities, the two have been differentiated with notability given to how "they carry themselves very differently...Itadori is outgoing, where Yuta is more reserved." In regards to his age, while Yuji is a teenager, early in the series he mentions he has been playing pachinko. Akutami was concerned about this scene as it would fit the young demography of the manga, shonen manga, but ultimately left this mention uncensored.

Casting

Junya Enoki is Yuji's Japanese actor. He relates having problems understanding the character believing him to be a more complex character he associates in other works despite his apparently typical traits. He associated him with Megmumi Fushiguro due to the mysteries they share. Enoki had no problems deciding the appropriate pitch for Yuji, something he discussed with the director. The actor further addressed that Yuji straightforward and due to how he analyses fights, he also comes across as intelligent. Despite seeing him an standard Shonen Jump protagonist, Enoki had fun voicing him, noting him to have several types of emotions he had to explore too.

Yuji Itadori is Adam McArthur's first work in anime, something he wanted to do ever since he was a child. He heard of the anime series from a friend and got help from one of his agents to audition for the role. The first episode's scene involving Yuji's grandfather's last words at death gave him an idea about how to portray the character. Since his grandfather wanted Yuji to help others, McArthur believed that Yuji is a teenager who likes helping people in need. McArthur used his experience of voice acting classes in the most serious scenes. The actor noted that is too kind to the point he finds him relatable. Following the dub of the series, McArthur look forward to his next work as Yuji.

Appearances 
Yuji first appears in Jujutsu Kaisen as an eccentric 15-year-old who lives with his grandfather Wasuke and is a member of his high school's occult club. On the day his grandfather's death, Yuji is approached by jujutsu first-year sorcerer Megumi Fushiguro, who inquires about one of Sukuna's fingers that the occult club illicitly obtained. He comes to Megumi's rescue when a swarm of cursed spirits attack the school, attracted by the finger. Yuji ingests the finger. Jujutsu master and teacher at the Tokyo school Satoru Gojo tells Yuji that he is intended for execution, It is delayed so that the world can be rid of Sukuna when Yuji eat all of Sukuna's fingers. Yuji moves into the school and is mentored in jujutsu personally by Satoru. He quickly strikes up a friendship with his fellow first-years, Megumi and Nobara Kugisaki. He seemingly dies during an altercation with a "curse womb" at a detention facility, wherein Sukuna blackmailed Yuji by holding his heart hostage.

Presumed dead, Yuji continues to work with his sorcery, uncovering his massive cursed energy using it for specialized cursed purposes. He strikes up a quick friendship with Junpei, which is derailed when he is killed by the cursed spirit Mahito. He also meets the 9 to 5 sorcerer and former salaryman Kento Nanami. After a fight that Mahito loses but escapes, Yuji swears revenge. At the exhibition between the Tokyo and Kyoto jujutsu schools, Yuji reveals to the world he has survived. Some want him dead immediately, while others side with Gojo to keep him alive temporarily. He strikes up a quick brotherly relationship with Kyoto's third-year Aoi Todo. Alongside Todo, he and the other jujutsu students and staff repel an invasion of the school by Mahito and Hanami, a cursed spirit who is environmentally conscious. During the battle he uses several consecutive punches called "Black Flash," a distortion in space that significantly empowers his cursed techniques. By the end of the battle, he and Todo are able to fight off Hanami long enough for Gojo to defeat the curse. Later, Yuji is assigned on a mission where he comes across two brothers who are both a Cursed Womb: Death Painting with curse and human blood. He and Nobara kill them, though Yuji expresses regret when he realizes they have physical bodies and that he disrupted their tight-knit brotherly bond.

In October of the same year, Yuji is sent to Shibuya when Mahito and the cursed spirits lay one final siege on the jujutsu sorcerers of Japan. During the battle, Yuji watches Nanami and seemingly Nobara get killed when encountering Mahito. This causes him to feel incredible guilt and pain. He also fights Choso, brother of the two Death Paintings. After the jujutsu sorcerers lose the battle and Surugu Geto (actually Kenjaku) unleashes thousands of cursed spirits and newly awakened jujutsu sorcerers onto the world, Choso tells Yuji that he is Yuji's older brother, and that Yuji has the blood of a cursed spirit. He is later hunted by other jujutsu sorcerers blaming him for the attack on Shibuya, including Yuta Okkotsu.

Sometime afterwards Yuji, Fushiguro, and second-year student Panda prepare to fight in Kenjaku's Culling Games between the newly born jujutsu sorcerers in Japan. It is also revealed Kenjaku is his "mother" who created him.

In the light novel, set during Yuji's time in hiding and secret training after being declared dead, he encounters Minato in a park. The boy unknowingly manifested a Cursed Spirit that appears in front of his adoptive parent's home at night. Yuji ultimately defeats it after a lesson from Gojo.

Powers and abilities 
Yuji is one of his school's most powerful and talented students. In high school, he had superhuman strength, reflexes, and overall athletic ability. He is incredibly agile and can run at up to 60.12 km/h. In the world of jujutsu sorcery, Yuji is also an exceptional prodigy. He has contended with and defeated Grade 1 and Special Grade curses, despite only having been introduced into the world a few months beforehand. He can contain Sukuna with little effort, and can harm the shape of a curse's soul in addition to their physical body. Yuji also has a strong durability, being able to walk off stab wounds and beatings. Among his jujutsu techniques are Divergent Fist where the flow of his cursed energy has a reverb effect against enemies, guaranteeing a second hit. He also uses Black Flash, a cursed energy hit that takes 0.000001 seconds to become enacted. He has used the Black Flash nine times so far in the manga, and up to four times in a row.

Reception 
Writing for Polygon, Chingy Nea initially stated to finding Yuji to be "a typical shōnen hero meant to appeal to young boys...He’s earnest and goofy like Naruto, incredibly self-sacrificing like Midoriya from My Hero Academia" but went on to acknowledge how "whereas the prototypical shōnen protagonist’s function is to change the world...[Jujutsu Kaisen] attempts to reconcile the ideals of its genre with the crushing nature of modern life...this affects Itadori. He is scared to die and is horrified by the world he has wound up in. But it doesn’t make him cynical, and it doesn’t stop him from pushing through his pain to try to help others." The character was also compared to Bleachs protagonist Ichigo Kurosaki due their parallels especially in the his early appearances; such being young fighters who develop supernatural powers as well as evil alter-egos in order to protect people from giant monsters. Comic Book Resources compared Itadori's temptation to use Sukuna as temptation similar to other shōnen heroes such Ichigo's Hollow persona as analysis of how everybody has inner conflicts.

Karen Lu, writing from Yale University, also took note of the way Yuji bent stereotypes about a young, male anime protagonist. She said that "instead of the protagonist bull-headedly persevering through the impossible and ignoring the advice of his friends, Yuji realizes very early on that he cannot save everyone" and commended the way the anime and manga demonstrates that "he actually has to get stronger and suffer death," concluding with the thought that "it’s inspiring yet sobering." Other positive reception has been directed at how Yuji "openly takes on a huge responsibility and sacrifices his own safety to save his friends"  and how his interactions with them "overflows with fun energy."

Eric Thomas of Discussing Film praised Yuji's introduction and looked favorably upon changes made to the character in the anime adaptation, remarking that "a scene that adds more depth between Yuji and his grandfather is in the pilot...is important to Yuji’s development, and the additional bits convey the protagonist’s emotions fantastically". He also praised the "incredibly talented voice actor who nail[ed] the performance."

When the prequel Jujutsu Kaisen 0 was released, critics often compared Yuji Itadori to his predecessor, the protagonist Yuta Okkotsu. Critics were divided which of the two protagonists created by Akutami was a more fitting for the protagonist role such as who is more relatable or more original as result of their different characterizations despite having similar parallels. Otaquest criticized the handling of Yuji in retrospective, finding him too simple in comparison to Yuta, comparing him more to Ichigo Kurosaki like other critics mentioned. Sportskeeda came to regards Yuta as a more compelling protagonist that Yuji based on his likable personality as well as his fighting style which he manages to control on his own in contrast to Yuji is often the subject of Sukuna instead.

Yuji was the number one fan-favorite Jujutsu Kaisen character on MyAnimeList (MAL) as of June 2021. In a VIZ popularity poll taken in March 2021, he was voted the second-most popular character in the franchise after Satoru Gojo.  At the 6th Crunchyroll Anime Awards in 2022, he was nominated for "Best Protagonist" and won a "Best Fight Scene" for his battle with Aoi Todo against Hanami. He also received a nomination in the same category for his battle with Nobara Kugisaki fighting against Eso and Kechizu. In May 2022, manga author Kenta Shinohara did his own tribute to the character of Yuji alongside Yuta and Megumi.

References 

Anime and manga characters who can move at superhuman speeds
Anime and manga characters who use magic
Anime and manga characters with superhuman strength
Comics characters introduced in 2018
Fictional avatars
Fictional Japanese people in anime and manga
Fictional characters with energy-manipulation abilities
Fictional characters with superhuman durability or invulnerability
Fictional demon hunters
Fictional exorcists
Fictional ghost hunters
Fictional male martial artists
Male characters in anime and manga
Martial artist characters in anime and manga
Teenage characters in anime and manga